The 2018–19 UEFA Champions League was the 64th season of Europe's premier club football tournament organised by UEFA, and the 27th season since it was renamed from the European Champion Clubs' Cup to the UEFA Champions League. For the first time, the video assistant referee (VAR) system was used in the competition from the round of 16 onward.

The final was played at the Metropolitano Stadium in Madrid, Spain, between Tottenham Hotspur and Liverpool, in the second all-English final after Manchester United beat Chelsea in 2008. Liverpool won the match 2–0 to claim their sixth European Cup – becoming the third ever team to do so, behind Real Madrid in 1966, and Milan in 2003. The win gave Liverpool automatic qualification for the 2019–20 UEFA Champions League group stage and the right to play in the 2019 UEFA Super Cup and the 2019 FIFA Club World Cup, the latter two of which they won. As Chelsea and Arsenal also reached the 2019 UEFA Europa League Final, this was the first season to have multiple finals of major European club competitions featuring teams from a single nation.

Real Madrid, who had won four of the last five titles, including each of the last three, were eliminated by Ajax in the round of 16. Although Ajax was eliminated in the semi-finals, they had played more matches than any other team in the tournament due to entering in the second qualifying round.

Format changes
On 9 December 2016, UEFA confirmed the reforming plan for the UEFA Champions League for the 2018–2021 cycle, which was announced on 26 August 2016. As per the new regulations, the previous season's UEFA Europa League winners will qualify automatically for the UEFA Champions League group stage (previously they would qualify for the play-off round, but would be promoted to the group stage only if the Champions League title holder berth was vacated, although this promotion to the group stage had been made in all three seasons since it was established from 2015–16). Meanwhile, the top four teams from the leagues of the four top-ranked national associations in the UEFA country coefficients list will qualify automatically for the group stage as well. Only six teams will qualify for the group stage via the qualification rounds, down from ten in the previous season.

This was also the first year to feature a preliminary round, in which the representatives of the four bottom-ranked national associations in the UEFA country coefficients contested single-legged semi-finals and a final to determine the final team to enter the first qualifying round.

Association team allocation
79 teams from 54 of the 55 UEFA member associations participated in the 2018–19 UEFA Champions League (the exception being Liechtenstein, which did not organise a domestic  league). The association ranking based on the UEFA country coefficients was used to determine the number of participating teams for each association:
Associations 1–4 each had four teams qualify.
Associations 5–6 each had three teams qualify.
Associations 7–15 each had two teams qualify.
Associations 16–55 (except Liechtenstein) each had one team qualify.
The winners of the 2017–18 UEFA Champions League and 2017–18 UEFA Europa League were each given an additional entry if they did not qualify for the 2018–19 UEFA Champions League through their domestic league.
The winners of the 2017–18 UEFA Champions League, Real Madrid, qualified through their domestic league, meaning the additional entry for the Champions League title holders was not necessary.
The winners of the 2017–18 UEFA Europa League, Atlético Madrid, qualified through their domestic league, meaning the additional entry for the Europa League title holders was not necessary.

Association ranking
For the 2018–19 UEFA Champions League, the associations were allocated places according to their 2017 UEFA country coefficients, which took into account their performance in European competitions from 2012–13 to 2016–17.

Apart from the allocation based on the country coefficients, associations could have additional teams participating in the Champions League, as noted below:
 – Additional berth for the 2017–18 UEFA Champions League winners
 – Additional berth for the 2017–18 UEFA Europa League winners

Distribution
In the default access list, the Champions League title holders qualified for the group stage. However, since Real Madrid already qualified for the group stage via their domestic league (as third place of the 2017–18 La Liga), the following changes to the access list were made:
The champions of association 11 (Czech Republic) entered the group stage instead of the play-off round.
The champions of association 13 (Netherlands) entered the play-off round instead of the third qualifying round.
The champions of association 15 (Austria) entered the third qualifying round instead of the second qualifying round.
The champions of associations 18 (Denmark) and 19 (Belarus) entered the second qualifying round instead of the first qualifying round.

In addition, the Europa League title holders qualified for the group stage. However, since Atlético Madrid, the Europa League champions, already qualified for the group stage via their domestic league (as second place of the 2017–18 La Liga), the following changes to the access list were made:
The third-placed team of association 5 (France) entered the group stage instead of the third qualifying round.
The runners-up of association 10 (Turkey) and 11 (Czech Republic) entered the third qualifying round instead of the second qualifying round.

Teams
League positions of the previous season shown in parentheses (TH: Champions League title holders; EL: Europa League title holders).

Notes

Round and draw dates
The schedule of the competition was as follows (all draws were held at the UEFA headquarters in Nyon, Switzerland, unless stated otherwise).

From this season, there were staggered kick-off times in the group stage at 18:55 CET and 21:00 CET. Kick-off times starting from the knock-out phase were 21:00 CET.

Qualifying rounds

In the qualifying and play-off rounds, teams were divided into seeded and unseeded teams based on their 2018 UEFA club coefficients, and then drawn into two-legged home-and-away ties.

Preliminary round
In the preliminary round, teams were divided into seeded and unseeded teams based on their 2018 UEFA club coefficients, and then drawn into one-legged semi-final and final ties. The draw for the preliminary round was held on 12 June 2018. The semi-final round was played on 26 June, and the final round was played on 29 June 2018, both at the Victoria Stadium in Gibraltar. The losers of both semi-final and final rounds entered the 2018–19 UEFA Europa League second qualifying round.

Drita's win on 26 June 2018 was the first time that a team representing Kosovo had won a game in any UEFA competition.

First qualifying round
The draw for the first qualifying round was held on 19 June 2018. The first legs were played on 10 and 11 July, and the second legs were played on 17 and 18 July 2018. The losers entered the 2018–19 UEFA Europa League second qualifying round, except one team were drawn to receive a bye to the 2018–19 UEFA Europa League third qualifying round.

Second qualifying round
The second qualifying round was split into two separate sections: Champions Path (for league champions) and League Path (for league non-champions). The draw for the second qualifying round was held on 19 June 2018. The first legs were played on 24 and 25 July, and the second legs were played on 31 July and 1 August 2018. The losers from both Champions Path and League Path entered the 2018–19 UEFA Europa League third qualifying round.

Third qualifying round
The third qualifying round was split into two separate sections: Champions Path (for league champions) and League Path (for league non-champions). The draw for the third qualifying round was held on 23 July 2018. The first legs were played on 7 and 8 August, and the second legs were played on 14 August 2018. The losers from Champions Path entered the 2018–19 UEFA Europa League play-off round, while the losers from League Path entered the 2018–19 UEFA Europa League group stage.

Play-off round

The play-off round was split into two separate sections: Champions Path (for league champions) and League Path (for league non-champions). The draw for the play-off round was held on 6 August 2018. The first legs were played on 21 and 22 August, and the second legs were played on 28 and 29 August. The losers from both Champions Path and League Path entered the 2018–19 UEFA Europa League group stage.

Group stage

The draw for the group stage was held on 30 August 2018 at the Grimaldi Forum in Monaco. The 32 teams were drawn into eight groups of four, with the restriction that teams from the same association could not be drawn against each other. For the draw, the teams were seeded into four pots based on the following principles (introduced starting this season):
Pot 1 contained the Champions League and Europa League title holders, and the champions of the top six associations based on their 2017 UEFA country coefficients. If either or both title holders were one of the champions of the top six associations, the champions of the next highest ranked association(s) are also seeded into Pot 1.
Pot 2, 3 and 4 contained the remaining teams, seeded based on their 2018 UEFA club coefficients.

In each group, teams played against each other home-and-away in a round-robin format. The group winners and runners-up advanced to the round of 16, while the third-placed teams entered the 2018–19 UEFA Europa League round of 32. The matchdays were 18–19 September, 2–3 October, 23–24 October, 6–7 November, 27–28 November, and 11–12 December 2018.

The youth teams of the clubs that qualified for the group stage also participated in the 2018–19 UEFA Youth League on the same matchdays, where they competed in the UEFA Champions League Path (the youth domestic champions of the top 32 associations competed in a separate Domestic Champions Path until the play-offs).

A total of fifteen national associations were represented in the group stage. 1899 Hoffenheim, Red Star Belgrade (1991 European champions) and Young Boys made their debut appearances in the group stage (although Red Star Belgrade had appeared in the European Cup group stage).

Group A

Group B

Group C

Group D

Group E

Group F

Group G

Group H

Knockout phase

In the knockout phase, teams played against each other over two legs on a home-and-away basis, except for the one-match final.

Bracket

Round of 16
The draw for the round of 16 was held on 17 December 2018. The first legs were played on 12, 13, 19 and 20 February, and the second legs were played on 5, 6, 12 and 13 March 2019.

Quarter-finals
The draw for the quarter-finals was held on 15 March 2019. The first legs were played on 9 and 10 April, and the second legs were played on 16 and 17 April 2019.

Semi-finals
The draw for the semi-finals was held on 15 March 2019 (after the quarter-final draw). The first legs were played on 30 April and 1 May, and the second legs were played on 7 and 8 May 2019.

Liverpool staged an improbable 4–0 comeback win against Barcelona in a return leg fixture at Anfield, having lost the first leg to the Spanish side 3–0 at the Camp Nou. Meanwhile, Ajax were winning 3–0 on aggregate by the 54th minute of the second leg against Tottenham Hotspur, yet Spurs made a similarly dramatic comeback; with Ajax seconds away from the final, Lucas Moura completed his hat-trick in the 96th minute to seal the tie on the away goals rule. Both semifinals are considered among the greatest Champions League comebacks of all time.

Final

The final was played on 1 June 2019 at the Metropolitano Stadium in Madrid. The "home" team (for administrative purposes) was determined by an additional draw held after the quarter-final and semi-final draws.

Statistics
Statistics exclude qualifying rounds and play-off round.

Top goalscorers

Top assists

Squad of the season
On 2 June 2019, the UEFA technical study group selected the following 20 players as the squad of the tournament.

Players of the season

Votes were cast for players of the season by coaches of the 32 teams in the group stage, together with 55 journalists selected by the European Sports Media (ESM) group, representing each of UEFA's member associations. The coaches were not allowed to vote for players from their own teams. Jury members selected their top three players, with the first receiving five points, the second three and the third one. The shortlist of the top three players was announced on 8 August 2019. The award winners were announced and presented during the 2019–20 UEFA Champions League group stage draw in Monaco on 29 August 2019.

Goalkeeper of the season

Defender of the season

Midfielder of the season

Forward of the season

See also
2018–19 UEFA Europa League
2019 UEFA Super Cup
2018–19 UEFA Women's Champions League
2018–19 UEFA Youth League
2018–19 UEFA Futsal Champions League

References

External links

 
1
2018–19